Leda Battisti (born 24 February 1971) is an Italian singer-songwriter.

Background 
Born in Poggio Bustone, Rieti, Battisti graduated in classical guitar at the conservatory of Rieti, then in 1992 she won the Pippo Baudo's television show Partita doppia.

After enrolling the CET, a music school founded and directed by Mogol, and after several significant collaborations including Ottmar Liebert, in 1998 Battisti obtained her first success with the song "Come l'acqua al deserto". The same year Battisti dubbed Lucky in the original version of the animation film Lucky and Zorba, also recording the song "Non sono un gatto", part of the soundtrack of the film.

In 1999 Battisti entered the Sanremo Music Festival with the song "Un fiume in piena", ranking third in the "Newcomers" section and winning the critic's prize. In 2006 she was cast in the reality show Music Farm. In 2007 Battisti returned to Sanremo Festival, this time entering the "Big Artists" section, with the song "Senza me ti pentirai".  In 2012 she collaborated to the soundtrack, composed by Lucio Dalla, of the animated film Pinocchio.

Discography 
Album 
 1998 - Leda Battisti 
 2000 - Passionaria 
 2006 - Tu, l'amore e il sesso

References

External links  

 Leda Battisti at Discogs

1971 births
Italian women singer-songwriters
Italian singer-songwriters
Living people
People from the Province of Rieti
Italian songwriters
Pop rock singers
Italian pop singers
21st-century Italian singers
21st-century Italian women singers